Takbír at-Tashreeq is the recitation of Takbir during the period of tashriq. It is practiced by Muslims from the time of the morning prayer on the 9th day of the month of Dhul Hijjah until after the afternoon prayer on the 13th day of Dhul Hijjah (before entrance of the dusk prayer). The 9th is the day of Arafah, the 10th is the first day of Eid al-Adha, and the period from the 11th to the 13th of Dhul Hijjah are the 2nd to 4th days of Eid referred to as days of tashriq. During the period of Eid fasting is not permitted. Scholars differ whether Takbir at-Tashreeq is compulsory or highly encouraged, there is also disagreement over the wording to be used.

Origin
‘Ibráhím was ordered by Alláh to sacrifice his son ‘Ismá’íl. When ‘Ibráhím began moving the knife on ‘Ismá’íl, the angels were sent with a ram from Jannah. The angels exclaimed: Alláhu Akbar Alláhu Akbar (Alláh is the Greatest, Alláh is the Greatest). ‘Ibráhím heard the voice of the angels and said: "La 'iláha 'ill-álláhu wa Alláhu Akbar" (There is none worthy of worship besides Alláh and Alláh is the Greatest).

‘Ismá’íl heard this conversation and realized that Alláh had relieved him from this great trial and so he said: "Alláhu akbar wa lilláhil hamd" (Alláh is the Greatest and to Alláh belongs all praise).

References

Islamic prayer
Islamic holy days
Islamic terminology